is a Japanese comedian, television presenter and actor. He performs tsukkomi in the comedy duo Audrey. His partner is Toshiaki Kasuga. He is represented with K Dash Stage. He has a sister who is two years older than him.

Filmography
This list only features Wakabayashi himself, for appearances with his partner, see Audrey.

Variety
Current appearances

Former appearances

Dubbing

Radio

Solo live performances

TV dramas

Films

Stage

Advertisements

DVD, Blu-ray

Bibliography

Magazine serializations

Books

Discography

Awards

References

Japanese comedians
Japanese television presenters
Toyo University alumni
Comedians from Tokyo
Male actors from Tokyo
1978 births
Living people
People from Chūō, Tokyo